Dharasu is a town, near Uttarkashi in Uttarkashi district, Uttarakhand, India.

Geography
It is located at an elevation of 1339 m above MSL. The Dharasu Power Station is located there, on the Bhagirathi River.

Location
National Highway 108 originates at Dharasu. National Highway 94 passes through the town.

References

External links
 Satellite map of Dharasu

Cities and towns in Uttarkashi district